Queropalca District is one of seven districts of the province Lauricocha in Peru.

Geography 
The Waywash mountain range traverses the district. Other mountains are listed below:

 Allqay
 Chawpi Hanka
 Chinkana
 Kasha
 Kuntur Waqanan
 Llamt'a
 Mit'urahu
 Parya
 Runtuy
 T'uyu Hirka

See also 
 Mit'uqucha
 Ninaqucha
 Qarwaqucha

References